The Glencarlyn Historic District is a national historic district located in the Glencarlyn neighborhood of Arlington County, Virginia. It contains 276 contributing buildings, two contributing sites, one contributing structure, and one contributing object in a residential neighborhood in South Arlington. The area was platted in 1887 as Carlin Springs and continued to develop throughout the 20th century as a residential subdivision. The dwelling styles include a variety of architectural styles, ranging from Craftsman-style bungalows, Colonial Revival–style, and Queen Anne style dwellings. Notable buildings and sites include the Carlin Family Cemetery, Glencarlyn Library, and St. John's Episcopal Church. Also located in the district are the separately listed Ball-Sellers House and Carlin Hall.

It was listed on the National Register of Historic Places in 2008.

References

Queen Anne architecture in Virginia
Colonial Revival architecture in Virginia
Historic districts in Arlington County, Virginia
National Register of Historic Places in Arlington County, Virginia
Historic districts on the National Register of Historic Places in Virginia